Thomas Zhao Fengwu (June 14, 1920 - August 15, 2005) was a Chinese Catholic prelate, verbist, bishop of Yanzhou, prisoner for faith. He was recognized as a legal bishop by both the Holy See and the government of the People's Republic of China. Zhao was proficient in German.

Biography
Zhao was born in Jining, Shandong, on June 14, 1920, to a Catholic family. In 1939 he joined the Higher Seminary in Yanzhou (now Yanzhou District). On April 20, 1945, he was ordained a presbyterate.

Before his arrest, he was the parish priest of the cathedral parish in Yanzhou and the director of the hospital run by the diocese. In 1958 he was arrested by the Communist government and sentenced to a forced labor camp, where he worked as an agricultural laborer. He regained his freedom in 1980. After his release, he returned to the pastoral ministry in the diocese of Yanzhou and joined the Congregation of the Word of God. Then he was a lecturer at the Holy Spirit Seminary in Jinan.

In December 1992, he was elected administrator of the diocese of Yanzhou, and then its bishop. On May 18, 1993, in Jinan, he received the episcopal consecration from the hands of the anti-Bishop of Jinan and the chairman of the Catholic Patriotic Association Joseph Zhong Huaide. Co-Consecrators were the Apostolic prefect of Yiduxian Joseph Sun Zhibin and the coadjutor of the anti-bishop Zhoucun Joseph Ma Xuesheng. All three consecrators were ordained without the consent of the Pope and thus excommunicated.

Zhao was known for the fact that he spent most of his year riding his diocese by motorcycle, visiting diocese. During one such trip in 2005, he was found on a road near Tengzhou in severe condition and soon died. In the funeral mass, which took place on August 19, 2005, 600 people participated.

References

1920 births
People from Jining
2005 deaths
20th-century Roman Catholic bishops in China
21st-century Roman Catholic bishops in China
Bishops of the Catholic Patriotic Association